Ichthyophis singaporensis, the Singapore caecilian, is a species of amphibian in the family Ichthyophiidae endemic to Singapore. Its natural habitats are subtropical or tropical moist lowland forests, rivers, intermittent rivers, plantations, rural gardens, heavily degraded former forests, irrigated land, and seasonally flooded agricultural land.

References

singaporensis
Amphibians described in 1960
Amphibians of Singapore
Endemic fauna of Singapore
Taxonomy articles created by Polbot